Horondino José da Silva (5 May 1918, Rio de Janeiro – 26 May 2006, Rio de Janeiro), best known as Dino Sete Cordas ("Seven-String Dino"), was a Brazilian guitar player, playing primarily in the choro and samba styles. He is considered to be one of the leading performers of the Brazilian seven-string guitar. Appearing on recordings over the course of six decades, he worked with artists such as Pixinguinha, Carmen Miranda, Elis Regina, Cartola, Gilberto Gil, and more. His only recording as a lead collaborator was with the fellow 7-string guitar player Raphael Rabello.

Discography (incomplete)

Albums
1991 - Raphael Rabello & Dino 7 Cordas (with Raphael Rabello) (Caju Music)
2001 - Cafe Brasil - Various Artists
2002 - Cafe Brasil 2 - Various Artists

References

1918 births
2006 deaths
Brazilian guitarists
Brazilian male guitarists
Seven-string guitarists
20th-century guitarists
20th-century male musicians